Prince Aesang, personal name Wang Bang was a Korean Royal Prince as the first and oldest son of Jeongjong of Goryeo and Queen Yongui. As there was no detailed records left about his life, so it seems it all were removed and deleted during King Munjong's reign.

References

Korean princes
Year of birth unknown
Year of death unknown
Date of birth unknown
Date of death unknown